Pat Cerroni (born c. 1965) is a former American football coach. He served as the head football coach at the University of Wisconsin–Oshkosh from 2007 to 2021, compiling a record of 109–45. Cerroni was named interim head coach at Wisconsin–Oshkosh in January 2007. The interim tag was removed in December of that year. He grew up near Johnson Creek, Wisconsin.

Head coaching record

College

References

1960s births
Year of birth missing (living people)
Living people
Carroll Pioneers football players
Wisconsin–Oshkosh Titans football coaches
High school football coaches in Wisconsin
People from Johnson Creek, Wisconsin
Coaches of American football from Wisconsin
Players of American football from Wisconsin